The short-billed minivet (Pericrocotus brevirostris) is a species of bird in the family Campephagidae.
It is found in Bangladesh, Bhutan, Cambodia, China, India, Laos, Myanmar, Nepal, Thailand, and Vietnam.
Its natural habitats are subtropical or tropical moist lowland forest and subtropical or tropical moist montane forest.

References

short-billed minivet
Birds of Tibet
Birds of South China
Birds of Nepal
Birds of Eastern Himalaya
Birds of Southeast Asia
short-billed minivet
Taxonomy articles created by Polbot